Yoting is a small town located between Quairading
and Bruce Rock in the Wheatbelt region of Western Australia.

It was originally a station on the Quairading to Bruce Rock railway line when it was established in 1912. Lots were surveyed in early 1914 and the townsite was gazetted later the same year.

The name is Aboriginal in origin and was taken from the nearby Yoting well. The well or spring first appeared on maps in 1873. Bruce Leake, an early settler, noted that the words Yot means two women fighting with wannas or digging sticks.

The surrounding areas produce wheat and other cereal crops. The town is a grain receival site for Cooperative Bulk Handling.

References

External links 

Towns in Western Australia
Grain receival points of Western Australia
Shire of Quairading